Mimagoniates lateralis is a species of tetra in the genus Mimagoniates.  Its common names include

croaking tetra (a name also applied to M. inequalis and  M. microlepis).

References

Tetras
Taxa named by John Treadwell Nichols
Fish described in 1913